Terquin T. Mott (born January 30, 1974) is a former basketball player who played in the Continental Basketball Association, in Europe, Asia and South America. He played college basketball at La Salle University and Coppin State University and was the 1996 Mid-Eastern Athletic Conference Player of the Year.

In his first game with TDK Manresa, he scored 20 points in an 83–65 victory over Girona.

Mott played in the Continental Basketball Association (CBA) and earned selections to the All-CBA Second Team in 1999 and 2002.

References

External links
Terquin Mott Liga ACB profile

1974 births
Living people
American expatriate basketball people in the Philippines
American expatriate basketball people in Spain
American expatriate basketball people in Turkey
American men's basketball players
Basketball players from Philadelphia
Bàsquet Manresa players
CB Lucentum Alicante players
Centers (basketball)
Coppin State Eagles men's basketball players
Fayetteville Patriots players
Galatasaray S.K. (men's basketball) players
Gijón Baloncesto players
Grand Rapids Hoops players
La Crosse Bobcats players
La Salle Explorers men's basketball players
Liga ACB players
Philippine Basketball Association imports
Power forwards (basketball)
Rockford Lightning players
San Miguel Beermen players
TNT Tropang Giga players